Child Bite is an American punk/metal band formed in 2005 in Detroit, Michigan. The band's core members are founding vocalist Shawn Knight and longtime bassist Sean Clancy. Child Bite's sound has been described as "enormous and predatory, from the baleful rhythm section to Shawn Knight's [frightening vocals]."

In the spring of 2013, the band released a split 7-inch with David Yow of Jesus Lizard and Scratch Acid. Morbid Hits, a collection of Anal Cunt cover songs, was released exclusively as a 5-inch vinyl record in early 2014 via Housecore Records. This release featured the band being fronted by Pantera/Down frontman Phil Anselmo.

As of 2018, Child Bite has toured the U.S. with such acts as Down, Voivod, Negative Approach, Superjoint, Poison Idea, Unsane and more.

Band members

Current 
Shawn Knight – vocals
Sean Clancy – bass
Jeremy Waun – guitar
Jeff Porter – drums

Former 
Brandon Sczomak – guitar
Jeff Kraus – drums
Ben Moore – drums
Zach Norton – guitar, bass
Danny Sperry – drums
Christian Doble – saxophone, backing vocals

Timeline

Discography

Albums 
Blow Off the Omens (2019)
Negative Noise (2016)
The Living Breathing Organ Summer LP (2010)
Fantastic Gusts of Blood LP (2008)
Wild Feast LP (2006)

Anthologies 
Burnt Offerings (2018, Housecore Records/Forge Again Records)

EPs 
Split 12-inch w/ STNNNG (2017, Forge Again Records)
Strange Waste EP (2014, Housecore Records)
Morbid Hits EP w/ Phil Anselmo (2014, Housecore Records)
Split 12-inch w/ We Are Hex (2013, Forge Again Records)
Vision Crimes EP (2013, Joyful Noise Recordings)
Monomania EP (2012, Joyful Noise Recordings)
Split 12-inch w/ Dope Body (2011, FAR)
Exquisite Luxury EP (2008, SSM)
Gold Thriller (2007, JNR/SSM)
Physical Education Split EP w/ Stationary Odyssey (2007, Joyful Noise Recordings)

Singles 
Jerk Off Your Life 1" Button w/ download (2016, Housecore Records)
Flexed Heads 7-inch w/ Hellmouth, Old Gods & Golden Torso (2014, Corpse Flower)
Gods of Love 7-inch w/ Hellmouth, Old Gods & Golden Torso (2014, Corpse Flower)
Demonomaniacs 7-inch w/ Hellmouth, Old Gods & Golden Torso (2012, Dyspepsidisc)
Chickenshit Conformists 7-inch w/ Hellmouth, Old Gods & Golden Torso (2012, Dyspepsidisc)
Family Men 7-inch w/ Hellmouth, Old Gods & Golden Torso (2012, Bellyache)
Split 7-inch w/ DD/MM/YYYY (2009, Wham City/Dyspepsidisc)
Split 7-inch w/ Big Bear (2009, JNR)
Split 7-inch w/ This Moment in Black History (2009, FAR)

References

External links 
Official website
Child Bite on Facebook
Child Bite on Bandcamp
Housecore Records
Forge Again Records
Joyful Noise Recordings
Suburban Sprawl Music

Musical groups from Michigan
Oakland County, Michigan
Musical groups established in 2005
2005 establishments in Michigan